Huntington High School is a four year high school located on top of a hill just outside Huntington, West Virginia.

History
Huntington High School was established in 1996 through the consolidation of the old Huntington and Huntington East High Schools. The school has a student body of approximately 1600 students. Huntington  High School carries the Highlander mascot with the colors old gold and hunter green. The Huntington High Staff consists of a principal, five assistant principals, five counselors, 142 teachers, five secretaries, an athletic director, and 10 custodians. Eleven cooks staff the cafeteria and offer a variety of both hot and cold lunch selections daily.  Four administrative offices can be found throughout the building to facilitate the needs of both students and staff. The award-winning curricular and extra-curricular programs offered at Huntington High School provide activities for all areas of interest. Huntington High is accredited by the North Central Association. In 2010, Huntington High School was featured in Jamie Oliver's Food Revolution Television show on ABC.  In 2016, after the filming of this television show focused on moderating eating habits and fighting obesity, the Cabell County Board of Education announced the school would pilot a program of unlimited and free food for all students regardless of socio-economic status.

Huntington High School (which combined old Huntington and Huntington East High School) was originally called Cabell West High School during the school project planning period. The name was then changed to Huntington Summit when the name of the other public high school in Cabell County was changed to Cabell Midland. The Cabell County Board of Education then decided that the new school should have connections to the two schools, Huntington High and Huntington East, that were being consolidated together. That is why the new school kept the Huntington High School name and then adopted the Highlanders nickname from the soon-to-be-closed Huntington East High School. The new school colors have no connection to the old high schools.

In 2022, the high school made national news over a series of walkouts associated with a religious service being held in the school's auditorium.

Student Body 
Huntington High, with an enrollment of 1,646, is one of the largest high schools in the state. The population is 50.85% male. The school is 77.46% White, 14.70% Black, 1.82% Hispanic, 0.85% Asian, and 4.86% of 2 or more races.

Post-Consolidation State Championships 

Boys Basketball – 2005, 2006, 2007, 2014, 2015, 2017
Girls Basketball – 2000, 2017, 2021
Football - 2022
Golf – 1997, 1998, 1999, 2019
Softball – 2007, 2008
Speech and Debate - 
Girls Soccer – 2004
Boys Tennis – 2000, 2004, 2011, 2012, 2017
Girls Tennis – 1997, 1998, 2001, 2004, 2009, 2011, 2012, 2013, 2014, 2016, 2017
Wrestling – 2013, 2014

Clubs and Organizations 
Beta Club
Fellowship of Christian Athletes
Future Business Leaders of America
Gardening Club
Herpetology Club
International Thespian Society
JROTC
Key Club
Latin Club
National Honors Society
ONYX Dance Team
Operation BEST
Philanthropy Club
Poetry Club
Nickelback Fan Club
Science Olympiad
Student Government (Member of the National Association of Student Councils)
Speech & Debate / National Speech and Debate Association
Vex Robotics Team
Young Democrats
Young Libertarians
Young Republicans

Notable alumni
 1939 - Dagmar, American actress, model and television personality of the 1950s.
 1944 - Soupy Sales, comedian and entertainer, notable panelist on the television hit What's My Line?
 1962 - Jacqueline Jackson, author and peace activist
 1977 - Bruce R. Evans, venture capitalist, corporate director and philanthropist
 1983 - Jim Thornton, American radio, television announcer, and voice actor
 1999 - Jeff Morrison, 1999 NCAA Tennis Singles Champion for the Florida Gators
 2002 - Chase Harrison, former MLS goalkeeper
 2005 - Griffin McElroy, podcaster, podcast host of "My Brother, My Brother and Me", "The Adventure Zone", and "Wonderful!" (all on Maximum Fun); voice actor in "Trolls World Tour" and "The Mitchells vs. the Machines"; and listed as a Forbes "30 Under 30" media luminary in 2017. 
 2007 - O. J. Mayo, basketball shooting guard
 2007 - Patrick Patterson, forward for the Oklahoma City Thunder
 2011 - Kayla Williams, 2009 Vault World Champion
 2019 - Darnell Wright, five-start football recruit

References

External links 
School Website

Public high schools in West Virginia
Educational institutions established in 1996
Schools in Cabell County, West Virginia
1996 establishments in West Virginia